Mirpur Royals is a Pakistani professional T20 franchise cricket team that takes part in the Kashmir Premier League. They are captained by Shoaib Malik, coached by former Pakistani cricketer Abdul Razzaq and owned by Abdul Wajid. The team represents the city of Mirpur, the capital of the Mirpur District.

Team Identity

History

2021 season

In first season of Kashmir Premier League, they finished with 3 wins and 2 losses from 5 matches in the group stage. They came third and qualified for the 1st eliminator. Although they defeated Overseas Warriors in the 1st eliminator, they lost the 2nd eliminator to eventual champions, Rawalakot Hawks, even though they scored the highest total in KPL history, it was chased down thanks to a century from Kashif Ali which meant that Mirpur were knocked out of the tournament.

2022 season

In July 2022, Shoaib Malik was retained by Mirpur Royals as their icon player.

Current squad

Captains

Coaches

Result summary

Overall result in KPL

Head-to-head record

Source: , Last updated: 31 January 2022

Statistics

Most runs 

Source: , Last updated: 22 August 2022

Most wickets 

Source: , Last Updated: 22 August 2022

References

External Links

Kashmir Premier League (Pakistan)
Cricket teams in Pakistan